is a railway station in the city of Inuyama, Aichi Prefecture,  Japan, operated by Meitetsu.

Lines

Station layout
The station has one side platform serving a single bi-directional track. The station has automated ticket machines, Manaca automated turnstiles and is unattended.

Adjacent stations

|-
!colspan=5|Nagoya Railroad

Station history
Haguro Station was opened on April 29, 1931. On November 3, 1966 it was renamed . A new station building was completed in 1977. The station reverted to its original name on October 9, 1985.

Passenger statistics
In fiscal 2015, the station was used by an average of 3295 passengers daily.

Surrounding area
Tobu Junior High School
Nambu Junior High School
Haguro Elementary School

See also
 List of Railway Stations in Japan

References

External links

 web page 

Railway stations in Japan opened in 1931
Railway stations in Aichi Prefecture
Stations of Nagoya Railroad
Inuyama, Aichi